Pseudogalium is a monotypic genus of flowering plants belonging to the family Rubiaceae. The only species is Pseudogalium paradoxum.

Its native range is Eastern Europe to Temperate Asia.

References

Rubiaceae
Monotypic Rubiaceae genera